Pouteria amapaensis is a species of plant in the family Sapotaceae. It is endemic to Brazil.  It is threatened by habitat loss.

References

Flora of Brazil
amapaensis
Endangered plants
Taxonomy articles created by Polbot
Taxa named by João Murça Pires